Concetta Milanese (born 8 July 1962) is a former Italian shot putter.

Milanese won seven national championships at individual senior level.

National titles
Italian Athletics Championships
Long put: 1982, 1983, 1985, 1988 (4)
Italian Athletics Indoor Championships
Shot put: 1983. 1984, 1985 (3)

References

External links
 

1962 births
Living people
Italian female shot putters
Sportspeople from Taranto
20th-century Italian women
21st-century Italian women